Richard Layton "Dick" Townsend (29 April 1928 – 22 November 1982) was a Canadian sailor. He placed eighth in the Swallow class at the 1948 Summer Olympics.

References

External links
  

1928 births
1982 deaths
Canadian male sailors (sport)
Olympic sailors of Canada
Sailors at the 1948 Summer Olympics – Swallow